The 2007–08 First Division season was the 13th season of the First Division in its current format of ten teams.

The team which finished first were automatically promoted to the Scottish Premier League. The team which finished bottom were automatically relegated to the Second Division and the team which finished second bottom were entered into the First division play-offs with the teams which finished second, third and fourth in the Third Division for a place in the 2008–09 First Division.

Promotion and Relegation from 2006–07

SPL and First Division
Relegated from Premier League to First Division
 Dunfermline Athletic

Promoted from First Division to Premier League
 Gretna

First and Second Divisions
Relegated from First Division to Second Division
 Ross County
 Airdrie United (via play-offs)
Promoted from Second Division to First Division
 Greenock Morton
 Stirling Albion (via play-offs)

Events

29 March: Gretna are relegated from the SPL to the First Division after losing 2–0 to St Mirren.
5 April: Ross County win promotion to the First Division as Second Division champions after defeating Berwick Rangers 4–0 and second place Airdrie United losing 2–1 to Brechin City.
8 April: Stirling Albion are relegated from the First Division after a 1–0 defeat to Partick Thistle.
19 April: Hamilton Academical win promotion to the Scottish Premier League as First Division champions following a 2–0 over Clyde.
10 May: Clyde retain their First Division status after defeating Airdrie United 3–0 on aggregate in the First Division play-off final.
29 May: Play-off runners-up Airdrie United are promoted to the First Division following Gretna's demotion to the Third Division.

League table

Results
Teams play each other four times in this league. In the first half of the season each team plays every other team twice (home and away) and then do the same in the second half of the season.

First half of season

Second half of season

Top scorers

Source: The League Insider

Attendances

Source: The League Insider

Managerial changes

Monthly awards

First Division play-offs

Semi-finals
The ninth placed team in the First Division played the fourth placed team in the Second Division and third placed team in the Second Division played the second placed team in the Second Division. The play-offs were played over two legs, the winning team in each semi-final advanced to the final.

First legs

Second legs

Final
The two semi-final winners played each other over two legs, the home team in the 1st Leg was determined by a draw conducted on 1 April 2008. The winning team was awarded a place in the 2008–09 First Division.

First leg

Second leg

Clyde remained in First Division.

Transfer deals
See: List of Scottish football transfers 2007–08

References

External links
 Scottish First Division 2007–08 on BBC Sport: News  – Recent results  – Upcoming fixtures  – Current standings
 Official Football League site

Scottish First Division seasons
1
2007–08 in Scottish football leagues
Scot